Catherine Roberge (born 8 February 1982, in Charlesbourg, Quebec) is a judoka from Canada.

See also 
Judo in Quebec
Judo in Canada
List of Canadian judoka

References

External links
 
 
 

 Profile at Sportcom.qc.ca

Canadian female judoka
Living people
1982 births
Pan American Games silver medalists for Canada
Olympic judoka of Canada
Judoka at the 2004 Summer Olympics
Judoka at the 2011 Pan American Games
Judoka at the 2015 Pan American Games
Pan American Games bronze medalists for Canada
Commonwealth Games medallists in judo
Commonwealth Games silver medallists for Canada
Pan American Games medalists in judo
Judoka at the 2002 Commonwealth Games
Medalists at the 2011 Pan American Games
Medalists at the 2015 Pan American Games
20th-century Canadian women
21st-century Canadian women
Medallists at the 2002 Commonwealth Games